Tata Salt was launched in 1983 by Tata Chemicals as India's first packaged iodised salt brand.
The brand is now the biggest packaged salt brand in India, with a market share of 17%.

The Indian salt market
As of June, 2019, more than 90 thousand metric tonnes of Tata Salt is sold through over 65 lakh retail outlets reaching 161 million households across the country each month. 

The market for packaged iodized salt and other salts in India is estimated to be worth Rs. 21.7 billion, with Tata Salt commanding a sales share of Rs 3.74 billion or 17.3% of the market.  Domestic competitors include Ankur, Annapurna, Sarbu, Captain Cook, i-shakti, Nirma Shudh and Aashirvaad. However major competition is only given by Surya Salt which holds the second largest market share after Tata Salt.

Products 
TATA salt is sold in two type of packing: 

 Multilayer Laminate Pouch
 Jars (PET & Glass)

TATA salt produce four
 different type of salt: 

 TATA salt plus
 TATA salt lite
 TATA Black salt
 TATA rock salt

Advertising
In its advertising, Tata Salt positions itself as Desh Ka Namak , translating roughly to "The Nation's Salt". The latest ad for the brand Ghul Mil ad talks about the unity in diversity of India as a nation and how its people blend with each other just the way Tata salt completely dissolves in water, showing that it is a pure salt.
price is Rs 20 in North East and Rs 18 in rest of India

Awards and recognition
Tata salt was ranked 316th among India's most trusted brands according to the Brand Trust Report 2012, a study conducted by Trust Research Advisory. In the Brand Trust Report 2013, Tata Salt was ranked 106th among India's most trusted brands while according to the Brand Trust Report 2014, Tata salt was ranked 199th among India's most trusted brands. It was among 16 of Tata Group's subsidiary brands to feature in the report apart from the parent brand. Ratan Tata also featured in the report among India's most trusted 'Personality' brands.
Tata Salt was the 2nd Most Trusted Brand of India in 2015.

References

External links
 Tata Salt, Official page
 Tata Salt on Tata Group

Indian brands
Brand name condiments
Companies established in 1983
Salt industry in India
Tata Consumer Products